Colonel Malcolm Archibald Albert Little (1905 – 5 October 1944) was a British soldier in the 9th Lancers and polo player.

Biography
He was born in 1905 to Brigadier-General Malcolm Orme Little and Iris Hermione Brassey.

He was killed in action in Cesena, Italy on 5 October 1944 in World War II.

References

1905 births
1944 deaths
British polo players
British Army personnel killed in World War II
Date of birth missing
9th Queen's Royal Lancers officers